Hyram Berenkotter Bagatsing (born February 18, 1985) is a Filipino professional basketball player for the Muntinlupa Cagers of the Maharlika Pilipinas Basketball League (MPBL). Bagatsing is the grandson of former Manila Mayor Ramon Bagatsing.

College career

Bagatsing played college ball at the De La Salle University and suited up for the De La Salle Green Archers in the UAAP.  He was part of the 2008 PCCL championship squad.

Professional career

Bagatsing declared himself eligible for the 2010 PBA draft, however, he was not picked by any team. He was then signed by Shopinas.com Clickers in 2011 as a free agent, reuniting with college coach Franz Pumaren.

PBA career statistics

Season-by-season averages

|-
| align=left | 
| align=left | Shopinas
| 7 ||	7.9 || .167 || .125 || 1.000 || .4 ||	.9 ||	.0 ||	.0 ||	1.0
|-
| align=left | 
| align=left | Kia
| 17 ||	17.1 || .396 || .365 || .500 || 2.2 ||	1.9 ||	.4 ||	.0 ||	6.6
|-
| align=left | 
| align=left | Mahindra
| 27 ||	11.2 || .329 || .286 || .571 || 1.2 ||	1.2 ||	.4 ||	.0 ||	2.7
|-class=sortbottom
| align=center colspan=2 | Career
| 51 ||	12.7 || .354 || .317 || .556 || 1.4 ||	1.4 ||	.3 ||	.0 ||	3.8

References

1985 births
Living people
American sportspeople of Filipino descent
Basketball players from San Francisco
Filipino men's basketball players
De La Salle Green Archers basketball players
Air21 Express players
Terrafirma Dyip players
Shooting guards
American men's basketball players
Filipino people of Indian descent
Bagatsing family
Filipino men's 3x3 basketball players
PBA 3x3 players